Gridino is a village  in Yegoryevsky District of Moscow Oblast, Russia, located on the Shuvoyka River (Guslitsa River's tributary), in the historical area of Guslitsa.  Informally, the village is also known as Gridino-Shuvoye.  Municipally, the village is a part of Shuvoyskoye Rural Settlement (the administrative center of which is the settlement of Shuvoye).  Postal code: 140301. Dialing code: +7 49640.

The village was first mentioned in 1673.

Our Lady of Kazan Church
The first wooden temple in honor of Our Lady of Kazan was built in the village in 1673. In 1864, after it burned down, a new wooden temple was constructed in its place.  The new temple was in service until 1959, when it was disassembled and its logs used to build a kindergarten in the nearby village of Selivanikha. On the opening day, however, the kindergarten building completely burned down.

New stone Russian Orthodox Church was consecrated in place of the old wooden one on September 18, 1999.

Spring and Our Lady of Kazan Icon Chapel near the Shuvoyka

	

The springs are believed to have appeared during the Polish invasion in the beginning of the 17th century.  According to legends, when some of the Poles and their followers stood at the place of the current Yegoryevsk, where False Dmitry II was later defeated by Prince Dmitry Pozharsky, on the bank of the Shuvoyka River the Russian troops fought one of the Polish detachments.  Both sides have suffered severe losses, and the blood that was shed led to the appearance of the icon of Our Lady of Kazan and the three springs. Later on, in 1673, a small wooden chapel was built on the high bank of the river in 1673; it was later re-built after the fire of 1864 and completely dismantled for construction materials during the anti-religious campaign in 1966.

For over three centuries, the place had remained popular among the pilgrims. In the early 1970s, there was an unsuccessful attempt to carry out reclamation work.

Currently, a small chapel and a sign explaining the appearance of the Our Lady of Kazan Icon are  located near the springs.

References

Official website of the Moscow Eparchy of Russian Orthodox Church. Gridino-Shuvoe. Our Lady of Kazan Church 
Иеромонах Серафим (Николин). Источник Казанской иконы Божией Матери в с. Гридино-Шувое. Website of the town of Yegoryevsk. 

Rural localities in Moscow Oblast